Fatta Bhand is a town and union council of Gujrat District, in the Punjab province of Pakistan. It is part of Kharian Tehsil and is located and at 32°42'0N 73°43'0E and has an altitude of 227 metres (748 feet). In 2013 General Election, Member of National Assembly (MNA) for NA-106 (Gujrat) was selected from this village first time after Independence 1947, He is Chaudhry Jaffar Iqbal.

References

Union councils of Gujrat District
Populated places in Gujrat District